The 2011–12 Cruz Azul season is the 65th professional season of Mexico's top-flight football league. The season is split into two tournaments—the Torneo Apertura and the Torneo Clausura—each with identical formats and each contested by the same eighteen teams. Cruz Azul will begin their season on July 23, 2011. Cruz Azul will play their homes games on Saturdays at 17:00 hours local time.

Club

Personnel

Coaching staff

Current Kit
Provider:  Umbro.
Sponsors:  Cemento Cruz Azul,  Coca-Cola,  Telcel,  Tecate,  Volaris.

Current squad

As of January 2011: Listed on the official website of Cruz Azul.

From youth system

Transfers

Summer

In and Loan

Out and Loan

Winter

In and Loan

Out and Loan

Competitions

Cruz Azul play three different tournaments in the 2011-12 season are Apertura 2011, Clausura 2012 and Copa Libertadores.

Overall

Results by opponent (league)

Source:Cruz Azul Matches at soccerway.com 2011–12 Primera División de México season article

Competitions statistics

Torneo Apertura 2011

Kickoff times are in CTZ or CST=UTC−06:00 and DST=UTC−05:00.

Pre-Season Summer 2011

Friendly during the season

Regular phase

General table

Final phase

Quarter-finals

Morelia won 2-4 in aggregate.

Torneo Clausura 2012

Kickoff times are in CTZ or CST=UTC−06:00 and DST=UTC−05:00.

Pre-Season Winter 2011

Regular phase

Classification table

General table

Copa Libertadores

Kickoff times are in CTZ or CST=UTC−06:00 and DST=UTC−05:00.

Second stage

Group stage

Classification table

Group table

Knockout stages

Round of 16

Libertad won on points 4–1.

Squad statistics

Start formations

Starting XI

|-----
!style="background: #C0C0C0;color:white" colspan="6"| 11 starters
|-----

 

|-----
!style="background: #C0C0C0;color:white" colspan="6"| Other starters
|-----

Apps, Goals and Discipline

League  = Apertura 2011 & Clausura 2012  

Cup  = Copa Libertadores  

Playoffs  = Final Phase of the Apertura 2011 & Clausura 2012

|-
|align="left"|||align="left"|GK||align="left"|
|24||-26||6||-3||2||-4||32||-35||4||0||(-) means goals conceded
|-
|align="left"|12||align="left"|GK||align="left"|Guillermo Allison
|0||0||0||0||0||0||0||0||0||0||(-) means goals conceded
|-
|align="left"|20||align="left"|GK||align="left"|
|0||0||0||0||0||0||0||0||0||0||(-) means goals conceded
|-
|align="left"|25||align="left"|GK||align="left"|
|10||-9||||-2||0||0||||-11||0||0||(-) means goals conceded
|-
|align="left"|61||align="left"|GK||align="left"|
|0||0||0||0||0||0||0||0||0||0||(-) means goals conceded
|-
|align="left"|||align="left"|DF||align="left"|
|29||0||2||0||1||0||32||0||8||2||
|-
|align="left"|||align="left"|DF||align="left"|
|14||0||0||0||0||0||14||0||4||0|| Injured.
|-
|align="left"|||align="left"|DF||align="left"|
|0||0||1||0||0||0||1||0||0||0||reinforcement only for the cup.
|-
|align="left"|||align="left"|DF||align="left"|
|27||0||1||0||2||0||30||0||1||0||
|-
|align="left"|14||align="left"|DF||align="left"|
|22||0||4||0||2||0||28||0||4||1||
|-
|align="left"|15||align="left"|DF||align="left"|
|||2||5||0||||0||style="background:#98FB98"|||2||2||0||
|-
|align="left"|16||align="left"|DF||align="left"|
|||2||6||0||2||0||style="background:#98FB98"|||2||5||1||
|-
|align="left"|17||align="left"|DF||align="left"|
|2||0||||0||0||0||||0||1||0||
|-
|align="left"|22||align="left"|DF||align="left"|
|||2||6||1||1||0||||3||0||0||
|-
|align="left"|64||align="left"|DF||align="left"|
|0||0||0||0||0||0||0||0||0||0||
|-
|align="left"|104||align="left"|DF||align="left"|Francisco Flores
|||0||||0||0||0||style="background:#98FB98"|||0||1||0||
|-
|align="left"|--||align="left"|DF||align="left"|
|0||0||0||0||0||0||0||0||0||0||reinforcement only for the cup.
|-
|align="left"|||align="left"|MF||align="left"|
|||0||1||0||2||0||||0||5||1|| Injured.
|-
|align="left"|||align="left"|MF||align="left"|
|||2||||0||2||0||||2||5||0||
|-
|align="left"|||align="left"|MF||align="left"|
|34||1||7||0||1||0||style="background:#98FB98"|42*||1||4||0||
|-
|align="left"|10||align="left"|MF||align="left"|
|||6||||1||2||0||||7||9||0||
|-
|align="left"|18||align="left"|MF||align="left"|
|||0||||1||0||0||style="background:#98FB98"|||1||2||0||
|-
|align="left"|21||align="left"|MF||align="left"|
|||0||||0||1||0||||0||4||0||
|-
|align="left"|23||align="left"|MF||align="left"|
|0||0||1||0||0||0||1||0||0||0||reinforcement only for the cup.
|-
|align="left"|24||align="left"|MF||align="left"|
|0||0||0||0||0||0||0||0||0||0||
|-
|align="left"|70||align="left"|MF||align="left"|
|0||0||0||0||0||0||0||0||0||0||
|-
|align="left"|73||align="left"|MF||align="left"|
|0||0||0||0||0||0||0||0||0||0||
|-
|align="left"|106||align="left"|MF||align="left"|
|0||0||||0||0||0||style="background:#98FB98"|||0||0||0||
|-
|align="left"|||align="left"|FW||align="left"|
|||8||||2||||0||style="background:#98FB98"|||10||1||0||
|-
|align="left"|11||align="left"|FW||align="left"|
|||1||||0||||1||||2||2||0||
|-
|align="left"|19||align="left"|FW||align="left"|
|17||3||||1||0||0||style="background:#98FB98"|*||4||1||0||
|-
|align="left"|27||align="left"|FW||align="left"|
|||6||5||5||2||1||||12||2||1||
|-
|align="left"|30||align="left"|FW||align="left"|
|||14||||1||2||0||||15||4||2||
|-
|align="left"|90||align="left"|FW||align="left"|
|||0||0||0||0||0||style="background:#98FB98"|||0||0||0||
|-
|align="left"|bye||align="left"|DF||align="left"|¤
|||0||||||||0||||0||2||0||loan to Estudiantes Tecos.
|-
|align="left"|bye||align="left"|MF||align="left"|¤
|||0||||||0||0||||0||0||0||loan to Neza FC.
|-
|align="left"|bye||align="left"|MF||align="left"|†
|||1||||||0||0||||1||2||0||out to San Luis.
|-
|align="left"|bye||align="left"|MF||align="left"|†
|||0||||||||0||||0||0||0||loan to Jeonbuk Hyundai Motors.
|}

Overall statistics team
{|class="wikitable" style="text-align: center;"
|-
!style="background: #6050DC;color:white"|
!style="background: #6050DC;color:white"|Total
!style="background: #6050DC;color:white"| Home
!style="background: #6050DC;color:white"| Away
|-
|align=left| Games played || 43 || 22 || 21
|-
|align=left| Games won    || 17 || 11 || 6
|-
|align=left| Games drawn  || 15 || 7 || 8
|-
|align=left| Games lost   || 11 || 4 || 7
|-
|align=left| Biggest win (Apertura)  || 2-0 vs. Puebla,0-2 vs. Estudiantes,3-1 vs. América || 2-0 vs. Puebla,3-1 vs. America || 0-2 vs. Estudiantes
|-
|align=left| Biggest win (Clausura)  || 0-3 vs. Toluca and 5-2 vs. Estudiantes || 5-2 vs. Estudiantes || 0-3 vs. Toluca
|-
|align=left| Biggest win (Libertadores)  || 4-0 vs. Deportivo Táchira || 4-0 vs. Deportivo Táchira || 1-2 vs. Nacional (PAR)
|-
|align=left| Biggest lose (Apertura)    || 1-0 vs. Pachuca,0-1, 2-1 and 1-2 vs. Morelia,1-0 vs. Santos Laguna,1-0 vs. Querétaro  || 0-1 and 1-2 vs. Morelia  || 1-0 vs. Pachuca,1-0 vs. Santos Laguna,1-0 vs. Querétaro,2-1 vs. Morelia
|-
|align=left| Biggest lose (Clausura)    || 2-0 vs. Morelia || 0-1 vs. Santos Laguna, 1-2 vs. Querétaro || 2-0 vs. Morelia
|-
|align=left| Biggest lose (Libertadores)    || 1-0 vs. Corinthians ||  || 1-0 vs. Corinthians
|-
|align=left| Goals scored    || 64 || 40 || 24
|-
|align=left| Goals conceded  || 44 || 22 || 22
|-
|align=left| Goal difference || +20 || +18 || +2
|-
|-
|-
|align=left| Most Game Started || 42 || colspan=2|  Israel Castro
|-
|align=left| Most appearances || 42 || colspan=2|  Israel Castro
|-
|align=left| Top scorer      || 15 || colspan=2|  Emanuel Villa
|-
|align=left| Points          || 66/129 (%) || 39/66 (%) || 26/63 (%)
|-
|align=left| Winning rate    || 17/43 (%) || 11/22 (%) || 6/21 (%)
|-

Goalscorers

Goal minutes
Updated to games played on 2 May.

Results

Apertura 2011

Results summary

Results by round

Clausura 2012

Results summary

Results by round

Copa Libertadores

Results summary

Results by round

IFFHS Ranking
Cruz Azul position on the Club World Ranking during the 2011-12 season, according to IFFHS.

References

External links

Cruz Azul
Cruz Azul
2011–12 Primera División de México season